Dayle Southwell (born 20 October 1993) is an English professional footballer who plays for Alfreton Town as a forward.

Southwell began his career with his home town team Grimsby Town and remained with the club for three seasons as well as a loan spell at Harrogate Town before being released in 2014. A prolific spell with Boston United that yielded 52 goals in 74 appearances later saw him move into the Football League with Wycombe Wanderers but he could not cement a regular place. He has since gone on to play back in Non-league and has turned out for Lincoln City, Guiseley, FC Halifax Town as well as a second spell with Boston before a move to King's Lynn Town. He is a former England C international having earned one cap in 2016 whilst a Boston United player.

Club career

Grimsby Town
Southwell came up through the Grimsby Town youth system and at 17 made his first senior appearance in the 2010–11 season. Southwell remained with the Mariners for three years, but despite regular substitute appearances, he was only given 10 starting appearances. During this period he also had a short loan in the Conference North at Harrogate Town, scoring 1 in 3 appearances.

Boston United
Southwell signed for nearby Conference North club Boston United in the summer of 2014, searching for regular football. In his first season, he started 39 league games and scored 28 goals. By the end of his first season with The Pilgrims he had scored 30 times from his 42 starts in all competitions.

His 2015–16 season started in a similar fashion and, by Christmas, Southwell had scored 15 goals in his first 23 games of the season. After an injury to his foot kept Southwell sidelined for ten weeks, he returned on 24 February to score his 16th League goal of the season. By the end of the season Boston had reached the play-offs, with Southwell scoring 24 goals and receiving both the National League North Golden Boot and Boston's Player of the Season 2015–16.

Wycombe Wanderers
Southwell turned professional on 21 June 2016 signing a two-year contract with Wycombe Wanderers. On his first Adams Park appearance for Chairboys, he scored the equalising goal against Brentford in a pre-season friendly which finished 1–1. On 3 February 2017, Southwell signed on loan with Lincoln City. It was a one-month loan.

Non-League career
On 9 January 2018, Southwell signed for Guiseley.

On 13 June 2018 Southwell signed a two-year deal with FC Halifax Town. Southwell then returned to National League North club Boston United on an initial 1-month loan on 5 December 2019.

Southwell moved to King's Lynn Town F.C. in January 2020, signing a two-and-a-half-year deal.

On 15 July 2021, Southwell signed for Alfreton Town.

International career
In May 2016, Southwell earned an England C call up for the forthcoming ICC fixture against Slovakia. It would prove to be his one and only England C appearance due to his new contract at Wycombe Wanderers.

Career statistics

Club

Honours

Player

Individual
Conference North Team of the Year: 2014–15

References

External links
Dayle Southwell – Player Profile at Wycombe Wanderers F.C. Official Site

1993 births
Living people
English footballers
Association football forwards
Grimsby Town F.C. players
Harrogate Town A.F.C. players
Boston United F.C. players
Wycombe Wanderers F.C. players
Lincoln City F.C. players
Guiseley A.F.C. players
FC Halifax Town players
King's Lynn Town F.C. players
Alfreton Town F.C. players
English Football League players
National League (English football) players
Footballers from Grimsby
England semi-pro international footballers